Blanket Waves is an EP album by American band Inventions. It was released in October 2015 under Temporary Residence Limited.

Track list

References

2015 EPs
Temporary Residence Limited albums